Horizon is a 2009 fantasy novel by American writer Lois McMaster Bujold. It is the fourth in the tetralogy The Sharing Knife.

Plot
With Fawn's prompting, Dag seeks out a teacher. A powerful groundsetter at local New Moon Cutoff Camp could be the answer to his prayers, but conflicts arise between the insular Lakewalker traditions and Dag's determination to be a healer for farmers. Dag, Fawn, Arkady the groundsetter and others embark on a long journey by wagon. They are joined by several other characters, some Lakewalker, some farmer, including Fawn's brother, Whit, and his wife, Berry. On their way up the Trace, a long wagon road, they encounter a malice, an evil being with great power. A Lakewalker kills the malice with a sharing knife. Fawn guesses that this malice was fleeing something even more powerful. That turns out to be a second malice. That malice is killed by Whit, aided by Fawn and Berry, which is unprecedented—no farmer has ever killed a malice without Lakewalker aid before.

At the end of the book, Dag and Fawn's vision of closer cooperation and understanding between Lakewalkers and farmers, as partners, is beginning to be achieved.

Characters
Dag Bluefield, née Redwing Hickory 
Fawn Bluefield, Dag's wife 
Whit Bluefield, Fawn's elder brother
Berry Bluefield née Clearcreek, Whit's wife
Remo — Pearl Riffle Crossing – patroller
Barr — Pearl Riffle Crossing, Remo's younger patroller partner
Arkady Waterbirch — New Moon Cutoff – maker, groundsetter
Neeta — New Moon Cutoff – patroller, back from 2 years exchange in Luthlia
Tavia — New Moon Cutoff, Neeta's partner
Hod — Boy formerly beguiled by Dag
Hawthorne Clearcreek, Berry's brother
Bo, Berry's maternal uncle

External links
 Publisher's Browse inside excerpt, Chapters 1–5

2009 American novels
American fantasy novels
Novels by Lois McMaster Bujold
HarperCollins books